Akhilesh Prasad Singh (born 5 January 1962) is an Indian politician from Bihar, India. He is a member of the Indian National Congress. In 2018, he was elected to Rajya Sabha from Bihar as member of Congress. He was appointed Bihar Pradesh Congress Committee President on 5th December 2022.

Political Career
He was an MLA from 2000-2004 in Arwal. He was a member of parliament of the 14th Lok Sabha (2004) from Motihari as member of Rashtriya Janata Dal. He lost from Purvi Champaran in 2009 and Muzaffarpur in 2014 Indian general election on Indian National Congress ticket. Singh also lost the 2015 Bihar Legislative Assembly election from Tarari constituency to Sudama Prasad.

References

People from Bihar
Living people
1962 births
India MPs 2004–2009
Lok Sabha members from Bihar
Rashtriya Janata Dal politicians
Indian National Congress politicians
Patna University alumni
People from Jehanabad district
Bihar MLAs 2000–2005
Rajya Sabha members from Bihar
United Progressive Alliance candidates in the 2014 Indian general election
Union ministers of state of India